Serdyte is an urban-type settlement in Shakhtarsk Municipality, Horlivka Raion in Donetsk Oblast of eastern Ukraine. Population:

Demographics
Native language as of the Ukrainian Census of 2001:
 Ukrainian 12.41%
 Russian 86.91%
 Belarusian 0.24%
 Moldovan (Romanian) 0.1%

References

Urban-type settlements in Horlivka Raion